"Milagro en el Congo / Venezia" is a single by the Spanish pop rock band Hombres G.  It is one of their very first singles, released through the label, Lollipop, in 1983.

The music on the single has been described as spontaneous and as being particularly influenced by the punk genre.  This was one of only two singles Hombres G released through Lollipop.  Difficult financial circumstances forced the label to delay new releases from the band.  In 1984, the group accepted an offer from the record label, Twins.  The song "Venezia" was re-recorded and an updated version included on their debut album, Hombres G.

In 2011, singer Miguel Bosé was quoted as saying, "La primera canción suya que escuché fue Milagro en el Congo.  Me encantaron" (English: "The first song I heard by them was Milagro en el Congo.  I really liked them.")

Track listing
Milagro en el Congo / Venezia 

"Milagro en el Congo" - 2:50
"Venezia" - 3:16

Personnel
Hombres G
 David Summers - lead vocals, bass
 Rafa Gutierrez - guitar, vocals
 Javier Molina - drums, vocals
 Danny Hardy - guitar, piano, vocals

Additional Musicians 
 Lidia Iovane and Eva Dalda - choirs
 Romy - percussion
 Fernando Cabello - tenor sax

References

External links
 Official site
 Discography
 Hombres G: Albums, Songs, Bios, Photos at Amazon.com

1983 singles
Hombres G songs